Neolttwigi or nol-ttwigi is a traditional outdoor game of Korean women and girls that is typically enjoyed on traditional holidays such as Korean New Year, Chuseok, and Dano.

Neolttwigi is similar to seesaw, except that participants stand on each end of the Neol (board) and jump, propelling the person opposite into the air.  When performed as a spectacle, acrobatic tricks such as flips or skipping rope while in the air are often included.

It is thought that Yangban women developed Neolttwigi to see over the walls that surrounded their homes, as women in traditional Korea were rarely allowed out of their living compounds, except at night. According to the legend, a wife who wants to see a husband trapped in a prison over a high wall could see the face of a husband through Neolttwigi with a wife of another sinner.

Neolttwigi also helped to alleviate the lack of exercise.

External links 
Teeterboard
Gallery
Korean Traditional Folk Games have Special Meanings for Women (The KNUTimes)

References

Korean games
Articles containing video clips